Luis Durnwalder (born 23 September 1941) is an Italian politician, former governor of the autonomous province of South Tyrol from 1989 until 2014, and former president and vice-president of Trentino-Alto Adige/Südtirol, in Northern Italy.

Biography 
Durnwalder was born in Pfalzen. After attending school in Pfalzen and Brixen, he originally planned to enter an Augustinian choir at the Neustift monastery in Brixen; however, Durnwalder decided instead to study agriculture at the University of Natural Resources and Life Sciences in Vienna, additionally he attended lectures in law. During this time he began his political activity and became chairman of the student group Südtiroler Hochschülerschaft (until 1965).

In 1969, he became mayor of his home municipality and in 1973 delegate to the provincial assembly; he was Regional Counsellor for the Land Register from 1973 to 1978. At that time he also worked as director of the farmers' association, Südtiroler Bauernbund, and moved to Bolzano, where he lives today. After the 1978 elections, he was elected member of the regional government. From 1989 until 2014 he presided over the provincial government as governor (Landeshauptmann).

Durnwalder is a member of the South Tyrolean People's Party.

He is Knight of Honor of the Order of St. George.

References

External links 

Biography on the homepage of the government of South Tyrol 

1941 births
Living people
People from Pfalzen
Members of the Regional Council of Trentino-Alto Adige
Presidents of Trentino-Alto Adige/Südtirol
Governors of South Tyrol
Knights Commander of the Order of Merit of the Federal Republic of Germany
Germanophone Italian people
South Tyrolean People's Party politicians
Members of the Landtag of South Tyrol
University of Natural Resources and Life Sciences, Vienna alumni
Mayors of places in Trentino-Alto Adige/Südtirol